Tine Schryvers (born 11 March 1993) is a former Belgian footballer. She played as a forward for Club YLA in Super League Vrouwenvoetbal and the Belgium women's national football team.

College
She attended the University of Memphis for the 2012 season. Prior to the 2013 season, she transferred to the University of Tulsa.

Club
She signed with Vålerenga Fotball Damer in January 2016, but after one season in the Norwegian Toppserien she moved to the Swedish top league to play for Kristianstads DFF.

She signed with Gent in January 2019.

She signed with OH Leuven in April 2020.

For the 2021/22 season she signed for Club YLA. This turned out to be her last season as a football player, as injuries and external factors proved too difficult to overcome.

International
She was called up to the Belgium squad for the 2016 Algarve Cup. She made her senior national team debut in the 4 March 2016 match against Canada.

Career statistics

College

Club

International
As of 23 October 2016

International goals
Scores and results list Belgium's goal tally first.

References

External links
 

1993 births
Living people
Belgian women's footballers
Belgium women's international footballers
Memphis Tigers women's soccer players
Tulsa Golden Hurricane women's soccer players
Vålerenga Fotball Damer players
Footballers from Antwerp
Belgian expatriate women's footballers
Expatriate women's footballers in Norway
Toppserien players
Belgian expatriate sportspeople in Norway
Women's association football forwards
K.A.A. Gent (women) players
Super League Vrouwenvoetbal players
Kristianstads DFF players
Damallsvenskan players
Expatriate women's footballers in Sweden
Belgian expatriate sportspeople in Sweden
Club Brugge KV (women) players